Artitropa is a genus of skippers in the family Hesperiidae.

Species
Artitropa alaotrana Oberthür, 1916
Artitropa boseae (Saalmüller, 1880)
Artitropa cama Evans, 1937
Artitropa comus (Cramer, 1782)
Artitropa erinnys (Trimen, 1862)
Artitropa hollandi Oberthür, 1916
Artitropa milleri Riley, 1925
Artitropa reducta Aurivillius, 1925
Artitropa usambarae Congdon, Kielland, & Collins, 1998

References
Natural History Museum Lepidoptera genus database

External links
Artitropa at funet
Seitz, A. Die Gross-Schmetterlinge der Erde 13: Die Afrikanischen Tagfalter. Plate XIII 80

Hesperiidae genera